Diectomis is a genus of tropical plants in the grass family. The only known species is Diectomis fastigiata, widespread across tropical parts of Africa, Asia, and the Americas.

References

Andropogoneae
Monotypic Poaceae genera